Déborah François (born 24 May 1987) is a Belgian actress. She is best known for her starring role in the Palme d'Or-winning film, The Child (2005), directed by the Dardenne brothers. In 2009, she won a César Award for Most Promising Actress for The First Day of the Rest of Your Life.

Early life
Déborah François was born in Rocourt, Liège, a provincial town of Belgium. She is the daughter of a policeman and a social worker, and the second of their three children.

Career
François grew up in Liège, which is in the French-speaking area of Belgium, and in 2005 she was discovered by two film producers (Jean-Pierre and Luc Dardenne) who gave her the principal female part in their film entitled L'Enfant – The Child. The film takes place not far from François's home town in the run-down industrial town of Seraing, features a young couple, Bruno and Sonia. The couple live off social security benefits and the proceeds of Bruno's robberies – he is the head of a gang of thieves. When Sonia gives birth to a baby, Bruno cold-bloodedly sells their child to a dealer for a few thousand euros. This film was awarded the Palme d'Or at the 2005 Cannes Film Festival.

After her début as an actress she left school and plunged into her next film in Denis Dercourt's Thriller La Tourneuse de pages - The Page Turner in 2006 which brought her further acclaim. In the film she plays the cool and calculating butcher's daughter Mélanie, who takes her revenge on the middle classes. Years before, she thought that her promising career as a pianist had been ruined by the carelessness of a famous pianist and member of a jury (played by Catherine Frot), so she now takes her revenge. Through a stroke of luck she manages to insert herself into the family unnoticed as a baby sitter and page turner. In this film François mimes the part of Mélanie, which won her special acclaim from the critics and for which she was nominated for a César Award in 2007.

In 2009, François won a César Award for her role as Fleur in The First Day of the Rest of Your Life. In that same year, she was also awarded the Romy-Schneider Prize and starred in the film My Queen Karo opposite Matthias Schoenaerts. She then starred in the 2010 film Mes chères études, (later re-titled Student Services), about a university student who turns to prostitution to pay bills. In 2013, she was nominated for the Magritte Award for Best Actress for Les Tribulations d'une caissière. In 2014, she was nominated for Populaire and in 2015 she was nominated for Maestro.

Personal life
François lives in Paris, France, after growing up in Liège, Belgium, where she attended the same high school as fellow actress Marie Gillain, who also features in Les Femmes de l'Ombre (as Suzy Desprez, while she assumes the role of Gaëlle Lemenech).

François said after the film L'Enfant: "My life changed completely. Before 'L'Enfant,' I thought, 'I'm this lucky girl who is going to make a movie, but that's going to be the only movie I'll ever make.' I had never even been to Paris before, and all of a sudden I'm around the world with festivals. It was very different from high school."

Audrey Hepburn, Lauren Bacall, and Grace Kelly are three of her favorite classic actresses. She was in a brief relationship with Mario Casas in 2020.

Filmography

Film

Awards and nominations

References

External links

 
 

1987 births
Living people
Belgian film actresses
Actors from Liège
21st-century Belgian actresses
Most Promising Actress César Award winners